John Guest (1867 – 6 October 1931) was a British Labour Party politician.

Guest was elected at the 1918 general election as Member of Parliament for Hemsworth.  He held the seat at the next four general elections, and died shortly before the 1931 general election.

Biography
Born in 1867 he lived all his life at The Elders, Main Street, South Hiendley below the Sun Inn. The Elders was passed down to his niece Miss Ada Guest who also passed away without issue. The Elders and the large orchard to its rear were demolished to make way for Orchard Drive housing by Hemsworth Council.

John Guest started his working life as a miner at age 14, starting at Hodroyd Colliery before moving on to South Hiendley Colliery and being selected as a delegate to the Yorkshire Miners Association at the age of 18.
He made his way up to Vice President of the Association in 1906 but was to give up the position in 1918 after being elected as Labour MP for Hemsworth.
He was the first MP for Hemsworth and not only defended his seat but gained increased majorities for each of the 4 terms he served before his death in 1931. His majority on his first election was less than 2,000, on the final election shortly before his death his majority stood at 20,000. His continued struggle to fight for the welfare and safety of the working class, especially miners is a testimony to his lifetime's work and undoubtedly saved many lives. Its thanks to people like John Guest that we have a Minimum Wages Act, a universal state pension, education reforms for all and Unions.

He made 131 contributions to the House of Commons up until 1928 when his health deteriorated. His first contribution was with regards to Coal Output and his last to Gas Carbon Monoxide poisoning.

He was a proud Wesleyan Methodist, Justice of the Peace, County Alderman and member of South Hiendley Parish Council since its inception in 1894.

He was once betrothed to a lady by the name of Ann Lambert but she was to die suddenly before they could marry so he lived with his older sister Rachel and her daughter Ada.

Death
Due to differences with his family, John Guest was carelessly buried in an unmarked grave in St. Peters church in Felkirk, near South Hiendley.
Seventy-five years later his great-nephew John Graham Guest was able to finally pay his respect by unveiling a plaque to mark his grave accompanied by then present Hemsworth MP, John Trickett.

References

 Monckton its Origins and History by P.A. Thorpe

External links 
 

1867 births
1931 deaths
Labour Party (UK) MPs for English constituencies
Miners' Federation of Great Britain-sponsored MPs
UK MPs 1918–1922
UK MPs 1922–1923
UK MPs 1923–1924
UK MPs 1924–1929
UK MPs 1929–1931